The 1928 Macdonald Brier Tankard, the Canadian men's national curling championship, was held February 28–March 2 at the Granite Club in Toronto.

For the first time, a tiebreaker playoff would determine the Brier champion as Alberta, Manitoba, and Toronto all finished round robin play with 7-2 records. Team Manitoba, who was skipped by Gordon Hudson defeated both Toronto and Alberta in the playoff to win the Brier.

Event Summary
After a successful Brier in 1927, the 1928 edition of the tournament was held again at the Granite Club in Toronto. For the first time, teams from Alberta, Manitoba, and Saskatchewan brought their own teams to the Brier. This increased the Brier field from 8 to 10 teams, which would last until 1931. In addition, regulation games would be shortened from 14 ends to 12 ends.

After a 7-0 start, it appeared that Team Manitoba would cruise to a Brier championship. But Manitoba would lose their last two games and finish in a three-way tie with Alberta and Toronto with 7-2 records, necessitating a tiebreaker playoff between those three teams. The trustees of the event did not anticipate a three way tie, so had to scramble to devise a format to resolve it. They opted for a round robin between the three teams. Manitoba defeated Alberta 12–7 in the first game, and then beat Toronto in the second game, 10–6 to claim the Brier Tankard. Alberta then beat Toronto 12–11 to finish in second place.

Teams
The teams are listed as follows:

Round Robin standings

Round Robin results

Draw 1
Tuesday, February 28 (morning)

Draw 2
Tuesday, February 28 (afternoon)

Draw 3

Draw 4

Draw 5

Draw 6

Draw 7

Draw 8

Draw 9

Tiebreakers
Friday, March 2

Provincial and territorial playdowns
1928 Alberta Provincial Playoffs (Alberta). The winning Heartwell rink had lost in the Saskatchewan playdowns, and decided to then play in the Alberta playdowns as well. No residency rule existed at the time.
1928 Macdonald Brier Event (Manitoba)
1928 New Brunswick Championship (New Brunswick)
1928 Canada Life Trophy (Toronto)

References

Macdonald Brier, 1928
Macdonald Brier, 1928
The Brier
Curling in Toronto
Macdonald Brier
Macdonald Brier
Macdonald Brier
1920s in Toronto